Derlis Alberto González Galeano (born 20 March 1994) is a Paraguayan professional footballer who plays for Paraguayan club Club Olimpia and the Paraguay national team. Mainly a forward, he can play as a winger.

González began his career with Rubio Ñu in 2009, and in 2012 was signed by Portugal's Benfica, spending his time out on loan in Paraguay with Guaraní and Olimpia Asunción. In 2014, he joined Basel in the Swiss Super League.

In December 2015, González was awarded as the Paraguayan Footballer of the Year.

Club career

Rubio Ñu
Born in Mariano Roque Alonso. González joined Rubio Ñu's youth setup in 2009, from Cerro Corá. He made his first-team – and Primera División – debut on 9 December of that year, starting in a 2–1 home win against 12 de Octubre; at the age of 15 years, becoming the club's youngest ever first-team player.

González scored his first senior goal on 19 September 2010, netting the opener in a 2–1 away defeat of Sportivo Trinidense. He would subsequently feature regularly for the first team in the following campaigns, as his side went on to establish themselves in the first division.

Benfica
On 10 October 2011, González agreed to a deal with Portuguese club Benfica, joining the club ahead of the 2012–13 season. Upon arriving, he was initially assigned to the under-19 squad in the Campeonato Nacional de Juniores.

In 2014, Benfica announced that González, together with compatriot Cláudio Correa, were sold to Master International FZC for €1.72 million.

Loan to Guaraní
On 12 February 2013, González was loaned to Guaraní until December. On 24 May 2013, González was referenced in the Spanish newspaper Marca as a future star, following the steps of Ángel Di María, who moved from Benfica to Real Madrid.

González scored 14 goals for Guaraní during the campaign, 12 only in the Clausura tournament. On 7 December 2013, he scored a hat-trick in a 6–0 home routing of Cerro Porteño PF.

Loan to Olimpia
On 16 January 2014, González moved to Olimpia until June, also in a temporary deal. He scored twice on his debut on 15 February, a 3–1 away success over General Díaz.

Basel
On 20 May 2014 Swiss club FC Basel announced that they had signed González on a five-year contract until 30 June 2019, for an undisclosed fee. He joined the team for their 2014–15 season under head coach Paulo Sousa. After playing in four test games González played his domestic league debut for the club in the away game in the Stadion Brügglifeld on 19 July 2014 as Basel won 2–1 against Aarau. He scored his first goal for his new club in the home game in the St. Jakob-Park on 31 August 2014. It was the first goal of the game, as Basel won 3–1 against BSC Young Boys.

The season ran well for Basel and their new striker. They entered the Champions League in the group stage. On 16 September González scored his first UEFA Champions League goal for Basel in a 5–1 group stage away defeat to Real Madrid. He added another on 4 November, in a 4–0 win over Ludogorets Razgrad. Basel reached the knockout phase on 9 December 2014, as they managed a 1–1 draw at Anfield against Liverpool. On 18 February 2015, González opened the scoring in the round of 16 first leg at home against Porto, the game ended with a 1–1 draw. Basel were knocked out of the competition after losing  4–0 in the second leg. At the end of the 2014–15 season, Basel won the championship for the sixth time in a row. In the 2014–15 Swiss Cup Basel reached the final. However for the third time in a row they finished as runners-up.

On 30 July 2015 Basel announced that González was leaving the club and had signed a five-year contract with Dynamo Kyiv. During his one season with the team, González played a total of 47 games for Basel scoring a total of seven goals. 26 of these games were in the Swiss Super League, two in the Swiss Cup, eight in the Champions League and 11 were friendly games. He scored three goals in the domestic league, three in the European games and the other was scored during the test games.

Dynamo Kyiv

On 30 July 2015, González signed a five-year contract with Ukrainian champions FC Dynamo Kyiv. Upon his signing, he became the second most expensive Paraguayan player and the second Paraguayan to play in Ukraine after Pedro Benítez (at Shakhtar Donetsk from 2004 to 2005).

On 22 August 2015, González made his official debut for Dynamo in a 0–6 away win in the 1/16 stage of the Ukrainian Cup against a Ukrainian First League team FC Hirnyk-Sport Komsomolsk, coming on as 45th-minute substitute. He scored his first goal for the club on 4 October, in a 4–0 away win against Vorskla Poltava in the Ukrainian Premier League.

Loan to Santos
On 31 July 2018, González agreed to a two-year loan deal with Santos. He made his debut for the club on 4 August, replacing Bruno Henrique late into a 0–0 away draw against Botafogo.

On 6 February 2020, González's loan was cut short.

International career
González represented Paraguay at under-15 and the under-20 levels, playing for the latter at the 2013 FIFA U-20 World Cup held in Turkey; at that tournament he scored the winning goal in a match against Mexico.

González made his debut for the senior team in a friendly match against Costa Rica on 26 March 2014, replacing Pablo Velázquez after 58 minutes. In November of the same year, he scored his first senior international goal with a penalty kick in a 2–1 defeat of Peru.

On 28 May 2015, González was included in Paraguay's 23-man squad for the 2015 Copa América by coach Ramón Díaz. He appeared as a half-time substitute in the team's opening fixture against Argentina, helping Paraguay recover from a two-goal deficit to draw 2–2 in La Serena. On 27 June, after Thiago Silva's handball, he scored a penalty in the quarter-final against Brazil in Concepción to level the score at 1–1; in the resulting penalty shootout, he converted the winning kick to take Paraguay to the semi-final.

During match day one of the 2018 FIFA World Cup qualification (CONMEBOL) on 8 October 2015 González scored the winning goal in the 85 minute as Paraguay beat Venezuela 1–0.

Career statistics

Club

International

Scores and results list Paraguay's goal tally first.

Honours 
Basel
 Swiss Super League: 2014–15
 Swiss Cup runner-up: 2014–15

Dynamo Kyiv
 Ukrainian Premier League: 2015–16
 Ukrainian Super Cup: 2016

See also
 Players and Records in Paraguayan Football

References

External links
 Swiss Football League official profile
 FC Basel official profile
 
 
 

1994 births
Living people
People from Mariano Roque Alonso
Paraguayan footballers
Paraguayan expatriate footballers
Paraguay under-20 international footballers
Paraguay international footballers
Association football forwards
Association football wingers
2015 Copa América players
Copa América Centenario players
2019 Copa América players
Club Rubio Ñu footballers
S.L. Benfica footballers
Club Guaraní players
Club Olimpia footballers
FC Basel players
FC Dynamo Kyiv players
Santos FC players
Paraguayan Primera División players
Swiss Super League players
Ukrainian Premier League players
Campeonato Brasileiro Série A players
Paraguayan expatriate sportspeople in Portugal
Paraguayan expatriate sportspeople in Switzerland
Paraguayan expatriate sportspeople in Ukraine
Paraguayan expatriate sportspeople in Brazil
Expatriate footballers in Portugal
Expatriate footballers in Switzerland
Expatriate footballers in Ukraine
Expatriate footballers in Brazil